The Philippines participated at the 2018 Asian Games in Jakarta and Palembang, Indonesia from 18 August to 2 September 2018. The country won 21 medals (4 gold, 2 silver, and 15 bronze) to finish 19th overall in the medal tally of the games; an improvement from 22nd place placement of the country in the previous 2014 edition. However this came short of the 15th place target set by officials who deemed the actual placement as acceptable. Two of the Philippines' gold medal came from golf, while the other two came from weightlifting and skateboarding.

Background

Julian Camacho is the chef de mission for the Philippines' stint at the 2018 Asian Games. The Philippine Olympic Committee approved a proposal from Camacho that only gold and silver medalists at the 2017 Southeast Asian Games and medalist of any color from the previous edition of the continental competition would compete in the 2018 Asian Games. Camacho justifying the move stated that he wanted to make sure every athlete can contend for a medal but remained open in including bronze medalists and other athletes to the delegation who can prove their worth by "figuring prominently in Asian-level tournaments" until the deadline of the submission of lineups.

The Philippines plans to send around 200 athletes and it is expected the athletes in contact sports has the best chances of winning medals.

Camacho, who was appointed by the past POC President Peping Cojuangco, filed his courtesy resignation as Chef de Mission in February 2018, following the election of new POC President Ricky Vargas. He was replaced by Richard Gomez, President of the Philippine Fencing Association and incumbent City Mayor of Ormoc, Leyte.

The government agency has also stated that it is willing to financially support "young and potential athletes" who will compete in the games.

The POC has submitted the final list of competing entries by names. A total of 272 national athletes competing in 31 sports will be fielded in for the 2018 Asian Games. 63 officials will also form part of the delegation.

Large part of the delegation attended the send-off ceremony hosted at the Malacañang Palace by President Rodrigo Duterte on August 13, 2018. Basketball player Jordan Clarkson will serve as the flag bearer of the Philippine delegation at the opening ceremony of the games on August 18, 2018 while skateboarder Margielyn Didal will be the flag bearer for the country at the closing ceremony.

Medalists

The following Philippine competitors won medals at the Games.

Gold

Silver

Bronze

Multiple

Medal summary

Medals by sports

Medals by Date

Archery

Compound

Recurve

Athletics

Men's Track

Men's Field

Women's Track

Women's Field

Marathon

Decathlon

Basketball

The basketball association of the Philippines, the Samahang Basketbol ng Pilipinas (SBP) had to come up with an agreement with the Philippine Basketball Association (PBA), the top-tier league in the country so that the Philippines could participate in the men's basketball event of the Asian Games. The two organization had also to consider the national team's stint in the 2019 FIBA Basketball World Cup qualifiers.

The decided against forming a "PBA Selection" team since the PBA Board can't afford to suspend the league for a month and a half. They also considered sending a team of composed of Gilas Cadets or rookie national players along with Andray Blatche though they deemed such team as not competitive enough. They come to a consensus to send a national team largely composed of one PBA team; the TNT KaTropa to aid national team-related scheduling.

The Philippines reportedly will not field a women's team, also will not participate in 3x3, a discipline in basketball that will debut in the 2018 Games. The SBP planned to send a 3x3 team led by AJ Edu and Kobe Paras. They could not send the same squad that participated in the 2018 FIBA 3x3 World Cup since the 3x3 event is restricted to players aged 18 to 23 years old. The plan did not push through due to time constraints.

Summary

5x5 basketball
The 12-man line-up of the national men's basketball team was released on June 18, 2018. The line-up is composed by 8 players from TNT KaTropa and 4 players from the Gilas Pilipinas/Gilas Cadets program led by Andray Blatche. However, it did not push through due to suspensions given to some of its players who were involved in the Philippines–Australia basketball brawl. The PBA gave the go signal to the Rain or Shine Elasto Painters to represent the country instead of TNT KaTropa. On 5 August 2018, the Samahang Basketbol ng Pilipinas reversed its decision to withdraw from the Asian Games, as well as announcing their 14-man pool for the continental meet.

The national federation attempted to secure clearance for Cleveland Cavaliers player Jordan Clarkson to play in the Asian Games from the NBA. The NBA initially did not consent and only allowed Clarkson to play for the national team in FIBA-sanctioned tournaments such as the 2010 FIBA World Championship qualifiers. Don Trollano was proposed to be Clarkson's replacement in the official lineup. The NBA later gave Clarkson consent, and issued a statement that he along with two of China's player competing in the Asian Games, Zhou Qi of the Houston Rockets and Ding Yanyuhang of the Dallas Mavericks, were given one-time exception to play in the Asian Games.

Men's tournament

Roster
The official lineup that will play at the 2018 Asian Games at Jakarta and Palembang, Indonesia.

| 

Preliminary Rounds - Group D

Quarter-Finals

5th–8th classification playoffs

5th place game

Bowling

Men's event

Women's event

Masters

Boxing

Men

Women

Bridge

Canoeing 

The Philippine Canoe Kayak Dragonboat Federation will be sending 14 men's and 13 women's at the Games.

Sprint 
Men

Traditional boat race 

Men

Women

Cycling

BMX

Mountain bike

Equestrian 

Jumping

Fencing

Gymnastics

Artistic Gymnastics
Men's

Women's

Rhythmic Gymnastics
Individual all-around

Trampoline Gymnastics

Golf

Men

Women

Jet ski

Judo 

The Philippines will participate in Judo at the Games with 5 athletes (2 men's and 3 women's):

Men

Women

Ju-Jitsu

Men

Women

Karate

Men

Women

Kurash

Men

Women

Pencak Silat

Roller sports

Skateboard

Men's

Women's

Sailing

Softball

The Philippines women's national softball team qualified for the Asian Games by finishing second in the 2017 Asian Women's Softball Championship.
Summary

Preliminary round

The top four teams will advance to the Final round.

Semi-finals

Sepak takraw

Men

Shooting

Men

Women

Soft tennis

Sport climbing 

Speed

Combined

Squash

Men

Women

Team

Swimming

Men

Women

Table tennis

Taekwondo

Poomsae

Kyorugi

Tennis

Triathlon

Volleyball

The Philippines participated in women's volleyball at the 2018 Asian Games. The final 14-player squad was announced on June 14, 2018.

Indoor volleyball

Women's tournament

Team roster
The following is the Philippines roster in the women's volleyball tournament of the 2018 Asian Games.

Head coach: Shaq Delos Santos

Pool A

Quarterfinal

5–8th place semifinal

Seventh place game

Weightlifting

The Philippine Olympic Committee has allocated a quota of two women weightlifters but the national weightlifting association, the Samahang Weightlifting ng Pilipinas has appealed the POC to allow a total of seven athletes to compete who have qualified under the Asian Games standard.

Men's events

Women's events

Wrestling

Men's

Wushu

Men
Nanquan\Nangun

Sanda

Taijiquan\Taijijian

Women
Sanda

Taijiquan\Taijijian

See also
Philippines at the 2018 Asian Para Games

References

Nations at the 2018 Asian Games
2018
Asian Games